Rogaland Police District is one of 27 police districts in Norway, covering Rogaland except Haugalandet. The district is headquartered in Stavanger and consists of three police stations, at Stavanger, Sandnes and Eigersund, and 13 sheriff's offices. The district is led by Chief of Police Hans Vik.  As of 2011 the district had 738 employees. The chief of police is responsible for the Joint Rescue Coordination Centre of Southern Norway at Sola. The police district was created in 2003 as a merger between the former Rogaland Police District and Stavanger Police District.

The easiest way to contact the police in Rogaland is by telephone, emergency ☎ 112, non-emergency calls at ☎ 02800 or ☎ (+47) 51 89 90 00.

References

Police districts in Norway
Organisations based in Stavanger
2003 establishments in Norway
Government agencies established in 2003